Jessica L. Amey (born November 15, 1976) is a former competitive butterfly swimmer from Canada, who competed for her native country at the 1996 Summer Olympics in Atlanta, Georgia. There she finished in 25th position in the 100-metre butterfly, after having won the silver medal in the 4×100-metre medley relay one year earlier at the 1995 FINA Short Course World Championships, alongside Julie Howard, Lisa Flood and  Shannon Shakespeare.

After her career on the Canadian national team, Amey attended Stanford University, where she swam for the Stanford Cardinal swimming and diving team in NCAA and Pacific-10 Conference competition.  After completing her undergraduate degree at Stanford, she graduated from the University of Toronto Faculty of Law.  She is currently a lawyer at McCarthy Tetrault LLP in Toronto, Ontario.

References

External links

1976 births
Living people
Canadian female butterfly swimmers
Canadian female freestyle swimmers
Medalists at the FINA World Swimming Championships (25 m)
Olympic swimmers of Canada
Swimmers from Montreal
Stanford Cardinal women's swimmers
Swimmers at the 1996 Summer Olympics
Commonwealth Games medallists in swimming
Commonwealth Games bronze medallists for Canada
Swimmers at the 1994 Commonwealth Games
20th-century Canadian women
Medallists at the 1994 Commonwealth Games